Misael Acosta Solís (Ambato, December 16, 1910 – Quito, April, 1994) was an Ecuadorian naturalist.

He earned a doctorate degree from the School of Natural Science of the Central University of Ecuador. In 1939 he became a corresponding member of the National Geographic Society of Washington DC. He was the Botanical Director of the Cinchona Mission in Ecuador of the U.S. Department of Agriculture. He founded the Forestry Department of Ecuador. He was a professor of Botany and Ecology at the Pontifical Catholic University of Ecuador. He wrote the 5-volume resource encyclopedia Los recursos naturales del Ecuador y su conservación (English: The Natural Resources of Ecuador and its Conservation), which was awarded the Wallace Atwood Prize from the Pan American Institute of Geography and History, and for which Acosta Solís was awarded the Humboldt Medal from the Culture Department of West Germany.

In 1968, botanist Jason Richard Swallen published Acostia which is a genus of South American plants in the grass family, which was named in Misael Acosta Solís's honor.

In 1982 Acosta Solís was the recipient of the National Merit Award, and 1989 he was the recipient of Ecuador's highest national prize Premio Eugenio Espejo for his work in the scientific field, which is awarded by the President of Ecuador.

References

Further reading
 Cuvi, Nicolás. 2005. "Misael Acosta Solís y el conservacionismo en el Ecuador, 1936-1953". Scripta Nova, 15 de junio, v. IX, N.º 191. En http://www.ub.edu/geocrit/sn/sn-191.htm
 Cuvi, Nicolás. 2005. "La institucionalización del conservacionismo en el Ecuador (1949-1953): Misael Acosta Solís y el Departamento Forestal". Procesos, no. 22 (I y II semestre): 107-129. En http://repositorio.uasb.edu.ec/bitstream/10644/1759/1/RP-22-ES-Cuvi.pdf
 Pérez Pimentel, Rodolfo: Diccionario Biográfico Ecuador, tomo 15 - Misael Acosta Solís

1910 births
1994 deaths
20th-century naturalists
People from Ambato, Ecuador
Central University of Ecuador alumni
Academic staff of the Pontifical Catholic University of Ecuador